Sam Ryder may refer to:

Sam Ryder (golfer) (born 1989), American golfer
Sam Ryder (singer) (born 1989), English singer-songwriter and social media personality

See also
Samuel Ryder (1858–1936), English businessman